Ambarlı is a village in the Borçka District, Artvin Province, Turkey. Its population is 170 (2021).

References

Villages in Borçka District